The 2012 UK Open Qualifier 1 was the first of eight 2012 UK Open Darts Qualifiers which was held at the K2 Centre in Crawley on Saturday 11 February.

Prize money

Draw

References

1